Oland Lighthouse is Germany's smallest lighthouse, being only  tall. It is located on the small Hallig of Oland. It serves as a cross light for the Föhrer Ley and Dagebüll channels. It is Germany's only lighthouse with a thatched roof. This small brick lighthouse was erected in 1929. Lit in the same year, it is still being maintained by a keeper. Until 1954 when it was electrified, the lantern was lit by liquified gas. For maintenance, the optic can be drawn out of the lantern casing on a slide. Its characteristic is "fixed", i.e. a continuous light, with white, red and green sectors. The red sector shines to the north and the green sector shines to the west. The white sector shines between the two coloured sectors or broadly towards the northwest or towards the town of Wyk on the island of Föhr from where it can be seen as a white light.

See also 

 List of lighthouses and lightvessels in Germany

References 

 
 Oland and Geschichte (in German) Tönning Water and Shipping Office.
 

Lighthouses completed in 1929
Lighthouses in Schleswig-Holstein
Buildings and structures in Nordfriesland